Ivar Mobekk (born September 15, 1959 in Elverum) is a Norwegian former ski jumper who competed at the 1980 Winter Olympics.

References

External links 

1959 births
Living people
People from Elverum
Norwegian male ski jumpers
Olympic ski jumpers of Norway
Ski jumpers at the 1980 Winter Olympics
Sportspeople from Innlandet